"Juicy" is the first single by American rapper the Notorious B.I.G. from his 1994 debut album, Ready to Die. It was produced by Poke of the duo Trackmasters and Sean "Puffy" Combs. "Juicy" contains a sample of Mtume's 1983 song, "Juicy Fruit", though it is directly sampled from the song's "Fruity Instrumental" mix, and has an alternative chorus sung by Bad Boy Records cohorts, the girl group Total and label boss, Combs. The song is widely considered to be one of the greatest hip-hop songs of all time.

Content
The song is a "rags-to-riches chronicle". The Notorious B.I.G. chronicles his childhood years living in poverty, his initial dreams of becoming a rapper, early musical influences, his time dealing drugs, criminal involvement, and his eventual success in the music industry and current lavish lifestyle.

One of the song's lines reads, "Time to get paid, blow up like the World Trade," referencing the February 26, 1993 bombing of the World Trade Center.

Production controversy
Producer Pete Rock alleged that Puffy stole the idea for the original song's beat after hearing it at Rock's house. In an interview with Wax Poetics, he said:

Pete Rock's remix of "Juicy" uses the same sample as the original. During an appearance on the Juan Epstein Podcast, Rock said that he has no hard feelings about how "Juicy" came about, but wished he had gotten the proper credit, although he did admit to harboring some ill feelings at the time.

Biggie appeared in the "Unsigned Hype" column of the March 1992 issue of The Source as "The Notorious B-I-G," and he was also listed as "The Notorious B.I.G." on a 1992 single by Neneh Cherry when he was signed to Uptown/MCA. Aside from sharing the same sample source, both songs share little in common otherwise, most notably in regards to subject matter.

Accolades
Blender Magazine ranked it #168 on its Top 500 Songs of the '80s–'00s list in 2005.
Bruce Pollock put it on his The 7,500 Most Important Songs of 1944–2000 list in 2005.
ego trip ranked it #1 on its Hip Hop's 40 Greatest Singles by Year 1980–98 list in 1999.
Pitchfork Media ranked the song at #14 on their Top 200 Tracks of the 1990s.
Pop ranked it #1 on their Singles of the Year list in 1994.
Q ranked "Juicy" the ninth greatest hip hop song of all time.
Rolling Stone ranked the song #424 in its list of the 500 Greatest Songs of All Time, moving to #32 in the 2021 revision.
Spex included it on The Best Singles of the Century list in 1999.
The Boston Phoenix included it on their The 90 Best Songs of the 90s list in 1999.
The Source included it on their The 100 Best Rap Singles of All Time list in 1998.
VH1 ranked it #7 on its "100 Greatest Hip Hop Songs Ever", and #1 on its "40 Greatest Hip Hop Songs of the 90s".
BBC ranked it #1 on its "Greatest hiphop songs of all time".

Track listing

12-inch
A-side
 "Juicy" (Dirty Mix) (5:05)
 "Unbelievable" (3:45) (produced by DJ Premier)
 "Juicy" (Remix) (4:42) (produced by Pete Rock)
B-side
 "Juicy" (Instrumental) (5:05)
 "Unbelievable" (instrumental) (3:45)
 "Juicy" (remix instrumental) (4:43)

Official versions
 "Juicy" (album version)
 "Juicy" (instrumental) – 5:05
 "Juicy" (dirty mix) – 5:05
 "Juicy" (remix) – 3:42
 "Juicy" (remix instrumental) – 4:43

Charts

Weekly charts

Certifications

In other media
On July 3, 2022, Juicy was added to the online Battle Royale video game Fortnite as a purchasable lobby music track. Thus being the first lobby track in the game to be a licensed song.

References

The Notorious B.I.G. songs
1994 singles
Bad Boy Records singles
Arista Records singles
Songs written by the Notorious B.I.G.
Songs written by Sean Combs
1994 songs
Songs about drugs
Songs about poverty
Songs written by James Mtume
Songs written by Jean-Claude Olivier
Songs written by Samuel Barnes (songwriter)
Songs written by Pete Rock